Fernando Baudrit Solera (October 23, 1907 – 1975) was a Costa Rican jurist.

Born in Heredia, he was the son of Oscar Baudrit González and Carmen Solera Pérez. He married Adilia Gómez Mesén. He graduated from the Law School of Costa Rica. He was a professor and dean of the College of Law at the University of Costa Rica, rector of the university from 1946 to 1953, member of the Asamblea Constituyente of 1949, and president of the Bar Association.

He was selected to be Magistrate of the Assembly of Annulment of the Supreme Court of Costa Rica for the period 1955–1963 and was re-appointed for the periods 1963–1971 and 1971–1979, although he died during the latter.

He presided over the Assembly of Annulment and the Supreme Court as a whole from 1955 until his death. His term as president of the Supreme Court is the longest in Costa Rican history and is considered one of the most brilliant. He was succeeded by the Fernando Coto Albán.

References
This article draws heavily on the corresponding article in the Spanish-language Wikipedia which was accessed in the version of 28 November 2005.

1907 births
1975 deaths
People from Heredia (canton)
Supreme Court of Justice of Costa Rica judges
20th-century Costa Rican judges
Academic staff of the University of Costa Rica